Trust Me is the biggest-selling Indian chick lit novel. Written by Rajashree, it is set in Bollywood, the Bombay film industry and uses the narrative structure of a 'masala' Bollywood film.

Explanation of the novel's title

The title of Trust Me comes from an old joke that is quoted in the novel:

‘You didn’t let me open your hand in the beginning, and even when you did, you opened it very slowly – that shows that you don’t trust easily,’ he said. ‘You’re too closed as a person. Open up, you’ll enjoy life more.’

I took my hand back from him and lit a cigarette.

‘Do you know what “trust me” means in Polish?’ I asked.

He shook his head.

‘What?’

“‘Fuck you.’”

He laughed. I smiled.

‘So, when a guy says “trust me”,’ I said to him, ‘a warning bell rings in my head.’

He made a face. ‘Why are you so hard, so defensive?’

‘Have to be, living in Bombay, alone.’

Plot summary

Set against the backdrop of the Hindi film industry, Trust Me is a comic story about love, heart-break and friendship. The protagonist, Parvati, decides to go off men when she is dumped by her boyfriend. She concludes that her girlfriends are right: all men are bastards. Her boss, the fatherly Mr Bose, is the one shoulder she can cry on. He is also the one man she never expects a pass from. She stands corrected: all men ARE bastards. Her girlfriends manage to keep their I-told-you-so’s to themselves.

Parvati quits her job, and joins the unit of Jambuwant (‘Call me Jumbo!’) Sinha, assisting him in making his latest Hindi feature film. ‘Jumbo’ is a Bombay film-maker archetype: he believes in white shoes, black money and the casting couch. Manoj, the chief assistant, makes a pass at every woman he meets because he doesn’t want anybody to feel unwanted. And Rahul, an actor, claims to have fallen in love with her.

Parvati hopes she is older now, and smarter - but perhaps not smart enough, because, very inconveniently, she finds herself liking Rahul far too much.

Literary significance and reception

Geordie Greig, editor, Tatler, and former literary editor, Sunday Times called Trust Me ‘a most enjoyable read.’ Kiran Nagarkar, author, Cuckold, said, 'Rajashree... has a genuine comic talent.’ Michele Roberts, author and former Man Booker judge, said about the book, ‘A feminist romance set in the Bombay film industry. Terrific story. Loved the humour.’ 
	
The book was received enthusiastically by magazines like Femina who said, ‘Looking for an exciting chick-lit book with a twist? Then you simply will not be able to resist Trust Me by Rajashree.’  Marie Claire said, ‘In this lighthearted debut, Rajashree balances comic and sad moods perfectly. A fun read!’  Cosmopolitan said, 'A weekend must-read for every chick-lit lover. Go get it!' 

The book sold 25,000 copies in the first month after its release. Its popularity can be seen in the context of the rise of regional varieties of chick-lit. Sometimes referred to as 'ladki-lit', Indian chick-lit seems to be coming of age.

In an interview to the New York Times, Helen Fielding said, 'I think it had far more to do with zeitgeist than imitation.' If the chick lit explosion has 'led to great new female writers emerging from Eastern Europe and India, then it's worth any number of feeble bandwagon jumpers.'  Sunaina Kumar wrote in the Indian Express, 'Ten years after the publication of Bridget Jones's Diary, the genre of fiction most recognisable for its pink cover art of stilettos, martini glasses and lipsticks, is now being colourfully infused with bindis, saris, and bangles. '

Publication history

2006, India, Rupa, Paperback

References

External links
 Rajashree's website
 Rajasindrajitkarmakarhree's Interview in The Times of India, 2007-11-13

2006 Indian novels
Indian chick lit novels
Indian comedy novels
Indian romance novels
Novels set in Mumbai
Bollywood in fiction
2006 debut novels
Literature by women